An Invitation to Worship is Byron Cage's second solo and fourth overall release on Gospocentric Records.  The album was recorded live at the New Birth Cathedral in Atlanta, Georgia under the production of PAJAM and peaked at #2 on U.S. Gospel charts.

Track listing

Byron Cage albums
2005 live albums